War is a 2007 American action thriller film directed by Philip G. Atwell in his directorial debut and featuring stage combat choreographed by Corey Yuen. The film stars Jet Li and Jason Statham, and was released in the United States on August 24, 2007. War features the second collaboration between Jet Li and Jason Statham, reuniting them for the first time since 2001 film The One. Jason Statham plays an FBI agent determined to take down a mysterious assassin known as Rogue (played by Jet Li), after his partner is murdered.

Wars working title was Rogue; it was changed to avoid conflict with another film with the same name. It was re-titled as Rogue Assassin in New Zealand, Japan, Hong Kong, Singapore, India, Australia, the Philippines, and several European countries.

Plot
During a shootout against Japanese Yakuza at a San Francisco dock warehouse, FBI agents John Crawford (Jason Statham) and Tom Lone (Terry Chen) stumble across the notorious assassin Rogue, a former CIA assassin who now works for the Japanese Yakuza. Rogue ambushes Crawford and is about to execute him when Lone appears and shoots Rogue in the face, causing him to fall into the water. Rogue's body was never found and he is presumed dead. However, Rogue survives and retaliates against Lone, his wife and his daughter. He kills them, burns down the house, and leaves their three corpses in the ashes of their home.

Three years later, Rogue re-appears, working under Chinese Triad boss Li Chang (John Lone). While working with Chang, Rogue secretly instigates a war between the Triads and the Yakuza, led by Shiro Yanagawa (Ryo Ishibashi). Rogue first attacks a club run by the Yakuza by killing the gangsters and later on the runners in order to recover a pair of antique gold horses, family heirlooms of Chang's.

Now the head agent of the FBI's Asian Organised Crime Unit, Crawford is determined to hunt Rogue down and exact revenge for Lone's death. Crawford's obsessive pursuit of Rogue has taken a toll on his personal life causing him to be estranged from his family. Crawford comes close to catching Rogue in the wake of Rogue's various killing sprees against the Triads and Yakuza, but Rogue always manages to stay one step ahead.

Ultimately, Rogue's actions have gained the trust of both Chang and Yanagawa. Rogue succeeds in killing Chang, but spares Chang's wife and child, turning on the Yakuza. With Chang dead, Yanagawa appears in America, intending to expand Yakuza business operations. However, he is confronted by Crawford and the FBI; Crawford presents Yanagawa with proof that Rogue has betrayed him and spared Chang's family, but Yanagawa refuses to assist Crawford in locating Rogue.

Later, Rogue delivers the horses to Yanagawa personally. Knowing of Rogue's betrayal, Yanagawa captures Rogue and demands the location of Chang's family. Rogue turns the tables on Yanagawa's men and kills them all, and engages in a sword fight against Yanagawa himself. Yanagawa discovers that the real Rogue was killed when attempting to assassinate Lone. Lone in turn surgically altered himself to assume the assassin's identity. Lone reveals that his actions have all been designed to bring him face-to-face with Yanagawa, so he could kill the man who ordered the death of his family. Yanagawa reveals that Crawford was in his pocket that whole time and responsible for leaking Tom Lone's identity and home address to the real Rogue. Angered, Lone disarms and decapitates Yanagawa.

Meanwhile, Chang's wife receives a package from Lone, containing one of the two golden horses that belongs to Chang's family and a message reading, "Make a new life". Yanagawa's daughter also receives a package with the same message and inside the box is her father's head. Lone then calls Crawford as he is packing up his office, asking him to meet him at the dock warehouse where they last made their investigation. Before going to the warehouse, Crawford enlists the help of Goi (Sung Kang), an FBI sniper that aided Crawford throughout the investigation.

At the warehouse, Crawford and Lone battle each other in an intense hand-to-hand fight in which Lone reveals his true identity to Crawford.

When Lone reveals his true identity, a devastated Crawford reveals that it was true that he was working for Yanagawa at the time but had no idea that Rogue was still alive. He was then blackmailed into giving Lone's address to Yanagawa thinking that Yanagawa's men were only going there to "rough him up a bit". Ever since, Crawford was angry at himself and wanted revenge against Rogue and those involved in what he thought was his partner's death.

Crawford asks for forgiveness, but Lone refuses and shoots him in the back after Crawford jumps in front of Goi’s line of sight to prevent a kill shot. The next day, Lone drives out of town to start a new life.

Cast

 Jet Li as Rogue/Tom Lone, a notorious international hitman whose real identity is Tom Lone, former FBI agent and former field partner of John Crawford.
 Terry Chen played Lone before he changed his face
 Jason Statham as FBI agent John Crawford, a corrupt FBI agent former field partner of Tom Lone.
 John Lone as Li Chang, a powerful Chinese mafia boss in San Francisco, Maria's husband, Ana's father, Shiro Yanagawa's archenemy, and Rogue's employer
 Mathew St. Patrick as Wick
 Sung Kang as Goi, an FBI agent fresh out of Quantico.
 Luis Guzmán as Benny
 Saul Rubinek as Dr. Sherman
 Devon Aoki as Kira Yanagawa, a Yakuza heiress who is the daughter of Shiro Yanagawa, the powerful boss of the Tokyo Yakuza.
 Ryo Ishibashi as Shiro Yanagawa, a notorious and powerful Yakuza boss from Tokyo, Japan who comes to the US to take over the Triad's territories. He is the archenemy of Li Chang and Rogue and the father of Kira Yanagawa.
 Mark Cheng as Wu Ti, one of Li Cheng's henchmen and brother of Joey Ti
  Johnson Phan as Joey Ti, one of Li Cheng's henchmen and brother of Wu Ti
 Nicholas Elia as Daniel Crawford, the son of John and Jenny Crawford
 Nadine Velazquez as Maria Chang, Li Chang's wife and Ana's mother
 Kennedy Lauren Montano as Ana Chang, the daughter of Li Chang and Maria Chang
 Steph Song as Diane Lone, Tom Lone's late wife who was murdered in the beginning of the movie.
 Andrea Roth as Jenny Crawford, John's wife and Daniel's mother
 Kenneth Choi as Takada, one of Shiro Yanagawa's henchmen
 Peter Shinkoda as Harbour Yanagawa Member, one of Shiro Yanagawa's henchmen 
 Angela Fong as Kabuki Dancer
 Kane Kosugi as Temple Garden Warrior
 Dario Delacio as Mahjong Player

Reception

Box office
War opened on August 24, 2007, with $9.8 million from 2,277 theaters, a $4,312 average. As of December 2007, the film grossed $22.5 million in the United States and $18.2 million in international box offices, totaling $40.7 million. DVD sales totaled $28 million.

Critical response
Rotten Tomatoes gives the film a score of 13% and an average rating of 3.90/10 based on reviews from 60 critics. The website's "Critics Consensus" for the film reads, "Jet Li and Jason Statham find themselves on opposing sides in the immensely boring War, which is full of clichés but short on action." On Metacritic the film has a score of 36 out of 100, based on reviews from 15 critics. Audiences surveyed by CinemaScore gave the film a grade B.

Paul Semel of Premiere wrote, "War is like Statham's other actioners The Transporter and Crash -- fun, but not big or dumb enough to be glorious." 
Joe Leydon of Variety magazine wrote "Quickly devolves into a standard-issue crime drama laced with routine martial artistry."

In 2014, Time Out polled several film critics, directors, actors and stunt actors to list their top action films. War was listed at the 93rd place on this list.

Soundtrack

The soundtrack was composed by Brian Tyler. The additional music is by RZA, Mark Batson and Machines of Loving Grace.

 "Spyked" – 2:31
 "War Opening Titles" – 5:05
 "Confession" – 3:05
 "Rooftop Pursuit" – 1:44
 "Whips" – 2:14
 "Swordfight" – 5:16
 RZA – "Rogue Cleans Da Hizouse" – 2:15
 "Getting Started / Scene of the Crime" – 2:51
 Mark Batson – "The Set Up / Mr. Chang Sends Regards" – 2:36
 "Shiro Comes to Town" – 3:55
 "Bangkok Downtown" – 2:18
 "This Isn't Japan" – 2:16
 "Cop Hunting / Face to Face" – 2:42
 Mark Batson – "Compliments of Mr. Chang" – 0:36
 "Rogue's Revenge" – 1:09
 "Showdown" – 2:49
 "Plans for Retaliation" – 4:00
 "Watching the Changes" – 0:45
 "Shiro's Estate" – 2:33
 "War End Credits" – 5:31
 Machines of Loving Grace – " King" – 4:04
 "War Opening Titles (Remix)"  – 4:54

References

External links

 
 
 
 
 
 War  original soundtrack at SoundtrackCollector.com

2007 films
2007 action thriller films
American action thriller films
American films about revenge
Films scored by Brian Tyler
Films set in San Francisco
Films shot in Vancouver
Lionsgate films
Triad films
Yakuza films
2007 directorial debut films
2000s English-language films
2000s American films